Kosova is the Albanian name of Kosovo, a partially recognised state in Southeastern Europe.

Kosova may also refer to:

Places
 Kosova, Maglaj, a village in the Maglaj Municipality, Bosnia and Herzegovina
 Kosova, Foča, a village in the Foča Municipality, Bosnia and Herzegovina
 Kosova, Estonia, a village in Põlva Parish, Põlva County, Estonia
 Kosova, Belarus, a town in the Ivatsevichy District, Brest Region, Belarus

Other uses
 Kosova Airlines, an airline
 Kosova Press, a news agency
 Kosova, a ship of the Ottoman Navy
 Kosova (1932 newspaper), an Albanian newspaper of 1932–1933
 Republic of Kosova (1991–1999), an unrecognized secessionist state before the Kosovo War

See also
 Kosova Hora, a village and municipality in the Czech Republic
 Bantu Kosova, people in Kenya who are also known as the Gusii
 Kosovo (disambiguation)
 Kosava (disambiguation)